The Battle of Voronezh, or First Battle of Voronezh, was a battle on the Eastern Front of World War II, fought in and around the strategically important city of Voronezh on the Don river,  south of Moscow, from 28 June-24 July 1942, as opening move of the German summer offensive in 1942.

Battle
The German attack had two objectives. One was to seed confusion about the ultimate goals of the overall campaign. There was widespread feeling by almost all observers, especially Soviet high command, that the Germans would reopen their attack on Moscow that summer. By strongly attacking toward Voronezh, near the site of the German's deepest penetration the year before, it would hide the nature of the real action taking place far to the south. Soviet forces sent to the area to shore up the defenses would not be able to move with the same speed as the Germans, who would then turn south and leave them behind. The other purpose was to provide an easily defended front line along the river, providing a strong left flank that could be protected with relatively light forces.

The plan involved forces of Army Group South, at this time far north of their ultimate area of responsibility. The attack would be spearheaded by the 4th Panzer Army under the command of General Hermann Hoth. Hoth's highly mobile forces would move rapidly eastward to Voronezh and then turn southeast to follow the Don to Stalingrad. As the 4th moved out of the city, the slower infantry forces of the Second Army following behind them would take up defensive positions along the river. The plan called for the 2nd to arrive just as the 4th had cleared the city, and Hoth was under orders to avoid any street-to-street fighting that might bog down their progress.

The city was defended by the troops of the 40th Army as part of the Valuiki-Rossosh Defensive Operation (28 June-24 July 1942) of General of Army Nikolai Fyodorovich Vatutin's Southwestern Front. Hoth's powerful armored forces moved forward with little delay and the only natural barrier before the city was the Devitsa River, an arm of the Don running through Semiluki, a short distance to the west. For reasons that are unclear, the bridge over the Devitsa was not destroyed, and Hoth's forces were able to sweep aside the defensive forces placed there and reach the outskirts of Voronezh on 7 July. Soviet forces then mounted a successful counterattack that tied up Hoth's forces.

At this point they should have been relieved by the infantry forces, but they were still far from the city. Intense house-to-house fighting broke out, and Hoth continued to push forward while he waited. At one point the 3rd Motorized Division broke across the Don, but turned back. The Soviet command poured reserves into the city and a situation not unlike what would be seen at Stalingrad a few months later broke out, with the German troops clearing the city street by street with flamethrowers while tanks gave fire support.

The 2nd did not arrive for another two days, by which time the 4th was heavily engaged and took some time to remove from the line. The 2nd continued the battle until 24 July, when the final Soviet forces west of the Don were defeated and the fighting ended. Adolf Hitler later came to believe that these two days, when combined with other avoidable delays on the drive south, allowed Marshal Semyon Timoshenko to reinforce the forces in Stalingrad before the 4th Panzer Army could arrive to allow taking of Stalingrad.

The Soviet forces recaptured the city in the Battle of Voronezh of 1943.

References

Sources
Glantz, David M. & House, Jonathan (1995), When Titans Clashed: How the Red Army Stopped Hitler, Lawrence, Kansas: University Press of Kansas, .

Conflicts in 1942
1942 in the Soviet Union
Battles involving the Soviet Union
Battles of World War II involving Germany
Battles of World War II involving Hungary
Battles and operations of the Soviet–German War
June 1942 events
July 1942 events